Papyrus 109 (in the Gregory-Aland numbering), designated by siglum 𝔓109, is a copy of the New Testament in Greek. It is a papyrus manuscript of the Gospel of John, containing verses 21:18-20 & 21:23-25 in a fragmentary condition. The manuscript has been palaeographically  assigned by the INTF to the early 3rd century CE. Papyrologist Philip Comfort dates the manuscript to the middle-late 2nd century CE. The manuscript is currently housed at the Papyrology Rooms (P. Oxy. 4448) of the Sackler Library at Oxford.

Description
The original manuscript probably measured 12 cm x 24 cm, with 26 lines per page. The handwriting script is representative of the Reformed Documentary style. The text is too small to determine its textual character.

Textual variants
John 21:18 (1)
αλλοι :    C D W 1 33 565 pc sy pbo,
αλλος : A Θ Ψ ƒ  lat

John 21:18 (2)
αποισουσιν σε :    D W 1 33 565 pc sy pbo,
οισει : A B C* Θ Ψ ƒ  lat sy
ποιησουσιν σοι οσα: *
επογουσιν σε : D*
απαγουσιν σε : D
οισουσιν σε : C

John 21:23
τι προς σε
incl. :   A B C W Θ Ψ ƒ  lat sy
omit. : * C 1 565 pc a e sy

John 21:25
ουδ :   B D W Θ Ψ ƒ 
ουδε : A C

Transcription 

John 21:18-20. 23-25
 18 [λες οταν δε γηρασης εκτε]ν̣ε̣ι[ς
 τας χειρας σου κ]αι αλλοι
 [αποι]ο̣υσιν̣ σ̣ε̣
 [οπου ου θελεις 19 τ]ουτο̣ δ̣ε
 [ειπεν σημαινων ποιω] θ̣α̣
 [νατω δοξασει τον θν και]
 [τουτο ειπων λεγει αυ]τ̣ω̣ ακο
 [λουθει μοι 20 επιστραφ]ε̣ι̣ς̣ ο̣
 [πετρος βλεπει τον] μ̣αθ̣η̣

 23 μ[ε]νε̣[ιν εως ερχομαι τι]
 προς σ̣[ε 24 ουτος εστιν ο μα]
 θητης [ο και μαρτυρων πε]
 ρι τουτ̣[ων και ο γραψας]
 τ̣α̣υ̣[τα και οιδαμεν οτι]
 [αληθης αυτου η μαρτυρια]
 ε̣σ[τιν 25 εστιν δε και αλλα]
 πολ̣λ̣[α α εποιησεν ο ιης̅ α]
 τινα̣ [εαν γραφηται καθ εν]
 ο̣υ̣δ̣ [αυτον οιμαι τον κοσμον]

See also 

 List of New Testament papyri
 Oxyrhynchus Papyri
 Gospel of John: chapter 21

References

Further reading 

 W. E. H. Cockle, The Oxyrhynchus Papyri LXV (London: 1998), pp. 19–20.

External links

Images 
 P.Oxy.LXIV 4448 from Papyrology at Oxford's "POxy: Oxyrhynchus Online" 
 Image from 𝔓109 recto, John 21:18-20 
 Image from 𝔓109 verso, John 21:23-25

Official registration 
 "Continuation of the Manuscript List" Institute for New Testament Textual Research, University of Münster. Retrieved April 9, 2008

New Testament papyri
3rd-century biblical manuscripts
Early Greek manuscripts of the New Testament
Gospel of John papyri